Sir Peter Derek Carr CBE (12 July 1930 - 21 October 2017) was a British public servant who had a career in National Health Service management and industrial relations. He was a founding director of Acas. He was chairman of the Northern Regional Health Authority. He was deputy lieutenant of Durham and knighted in 2007.

References 

1930 births
2017 deaths
National Health Service people
People from Mexborough
English civil servants
Deaths from Parkinson's disease
Deputy Lieutenants of Durham
Commanders of the Order of the British Empire